OSv (stylized OSv) is a cloud computing focused computer operating system released on September 16, 2013. It is a special-purpose operating system built to run as a guest on top of a virtual machine, thus it does not include drivers for bare-metal hardware. It is a unikernel, designed to run a single Linux executable or an application written in one of the supported runtime environments (such as Java). For this reason, it does not support a notion of users (it's not a multiuser system) or processes - everything runs in the kernel address space. Using a single address space removes some of the time-consuming operations associated with context switching. It uses large amounts of code from the FreeBSD operating system, in particular the network stack and the ZFS file system. OSv can be managed using a REST Management API and an optional command-line interface written in Lua.

References

External links
 
 Slides introducing the basic concept
 OSv—Optimizing the Operating System for Virtual Machines—paper presented at the USENIX Annual Technical Conference in 2014
 Original announcement

Computing platforms
Free software operating systems
Free software programmed in C++
Software companies of Israel
Software using the BSD license